Leon Glatzer (born 28 February 1997) is an American-born German surfer. He competed in the 2020 Summer Olympics.

Glatzer was born on the Hawaiian island of Maui to German parents, but he and his family moved to the Costa Rican beachside town of Pavones, where he grew up.

References

1997 births
Living people
German surfers
Olympic surfers of Germany
Surfers at the 2020 Summer Olympics
World Surf League surfers
American people of German descent
People from Maui
Sportspeople from Hawaii
People from Puntarenas Province